La Cadena SER (the SER Network) is Spain's premier radio network in terms of both seniority (it was created in 1924) and audience share (it had a regular listenership in 2018 of 4,139,000). The acronym SER stands for Sociedad Española de Radiodifusión (Spanish Broadcasting Company).

Cadena SER's programmes – which includes news, sport, talk, entertainment and culture – can be received throughout Spain. The network's main studios are located on the Gran Vía in Madrid; In addition, studios across the country contribute with local and regional news and information, and local programming in each location amounting between 2 and 3.5 hours daily.

Cadena SER is owned by Unión Radio, the majority shareholder in which is currently the PRISA group, a major player in the Spanish media market which also controls, music radio stations such as LOS40, Cadena Dial, Radiolé and a number of newspapers (including the influential national daily El País), as well as other media in Spanish-speaking countries around the world.

History
At 18:30 on Friday, 14 November 1924, station EAJ-1 Radio Barcelona, the first Spanish radio station to receive an official license from the government of General Miguel Primo de Rivera, began regular broadcasting. Seven months later, on June 17, 1925, Unión Radio – a company which had the backing of the leading manufacturers of electrical and broadcasting equipment in Spain, Germany, and the United States – opened station EAJ-7 Radio Madrid, and when the foundations were in place for the formation of Spain's first national radio network on 10 November 1926, this same company also took over the ownership of Radio Barcelona. By 1927 Unión Radio was operating not only Radio Madrid and Radio Barcelona, but also EAJ-5 Radio Sevilla, EAJ-9 Radio Bilbao, and EAJ-22 Radio Salamanca, enabling all of these stations to broadcast simultaneous, i.e. networked, programming for most of their time on air, with Radio Madrid as the chief production center.

Through the remaining years of the monarchy (until 1930), and during the Second Spanish Republic (1931–1939), Unión Radio continued to be Spain's only nationwide radio network. Unión Radio created Spain's first national radio news programme La Palabra ("The Word"), broadcast several times daily. However, from 1939 until 1977, under the dictatorship of General Francisco Franco and the initial part of the transition to democracy, the network was forbidden from carrying any national news programming other than the compulsory twice-daily relays of the official news bulletins prepared by the government-controlled Radio Nacional de España.

On 25 September 1940, ownership of Unión Radio was transferred to the newly constituted Sociedad Española de Radiodifusión ("Spanish Broadcasting Company"), and the network renamed itself Cadena SER. In 1975, 25% of the shares in the network were compulsorily acquired by the Spanish state, and in 1984 most of the remaining shares were purchased by the PRISA media conglomerate. The nationalized shares were subsequently sold back to the private sector (in effect, to PRISA) under the premiership of Felipe González in 1992.

The network played a significant role in the period of transition to democracy following the death of Franco and in the years leading up to and immediately following the adoption of the Spanish Constitution of 1978, notably in its coverage of the attempted coup of 23 February 1981. Cadena SER also played a vital journalistic role with its reporting of the events and circumstances of the 2004 Madrid train bombings.

Cadena Ser registered 4,367,000 listeners according to the first wave of the General Media Study (EGM) for 2021. This was the station's highest result since 2017, and is significantly higher than competitor stations Cope and Onda Cero. Their morning show Hoy por Hoy reached a daily audience of 3,550,000 listeners in 2021.

Politics
Cadena SER, along with other media in the PRISA group, is considered to be close to Spain's center-left political party, the Spanish Socialist Workers' Party (PSOE). There have been many disputes with the other main privately owned radio network in Spain, the right-wing Cadena COPE, which is owned by the Spanish Episcopal Conference.

Sports
Cadena SER is also the leader in radio sports coverage. The network covers every match in La Liga, in the UEFA Champions League games whenever a Spanish team is playing, and matches involving the Spain national football team.

Notable programmes

Notable programmes on Cadena SER include Hoy por hoy, broadcasting news and current affairs in the morning, which was first aired on 22 September 1986; El Larguero (the late nightly sports programme, on air since 1989); Hablar por hablar, a talk show first broadcast in 1989 for Radio Barcelona; El Mundo Today for comedy, and Carrusel Deportivo for sports, Spain's oldest, and still remaining, radio programme dating to 1952.

Logos

Sources
 Carmelo Garitaonaindía; La radio en España (1923-1939), Siglo Veintuno de España, Madrid, 1988. 
 Lorenzo Díaz; La radio en España, 1923-1977, Alianza Editorial, Madrid, 1997.

References

External links 

Official website
Cadena SER radio barcelona online
An orchestral arrangement of Cadena SER's interval signal, Sinfonía Azul

 
Radio stations in Spain
PRISA
European Broadcasting Union members
Radio stations established in 1924
Gran Vía (Madrid)
1924 establishments in Spain